The 2010 Victory Road was a professional wrestling pay-per-view event produced by Total Nonstop Action Wrestling (TNA), which took place on July 11, 2010 at the TNA Impact! Zone in Orlando, Florida. It was the sixth event under the Victory Road chronology and the seventh event of the 2010 TNA PPV schedule.

In October 2017, with the launch of the Global Wrestling Network, the event became available to stream on demand.

Storylines

Victory Road featured nine professional wrestling matches that involved different wrestlers from pre-existing scripted feuds and storylines. Wrestlers portrayed villains, heroes, or less distinguishable characters in the scripted events that built tension and culminated in a wrestling match or series of matches.

Results

Tournament bracket
Teams:
The Band (Eric Young and Kevin Nash)
Ink Inc. (Jesse Neal and Shannon Moore)
Team 3D (Brother Ray and Brother Devon)
Beer Money, Inc. (James Storm and Robert Roode)

References

External links
TNA Wrestling.com
Victory Road Official Website

Impact Wrestling Victory Road
Professional wrestling in Orlando, Florida
2010 in professional wrestling in Florida
Events in Orlando, Florida
July 2010 events in the United States
2010 Total Nonstop Action Wrestling pay-per-view events